Black bear or Blackbear may refer to:

Animals
 American black bear (Ursus americanus), a North American bear species
 Asian black bear (Ursus thibetanus), an Asian bear species

Music
 Black Bear (band), a Canadian First Nations group
 Blackbear (musician) (born 1990), stage name of American musician Matthew Musto
 Black Bear Road (album), a 1975 album by country musician C. W. McCall

People
 Black Bear (chief), Arapaho leader
 Blackbear Bosin (1921–1980), Comanche-Kiowa sculptor and painter
 Peter Blackbear (1899–1976), American professional football player

Places
 Black Bear Creek, Oklahoma
 Black Bear Resort, Idaho
 Black Bear, California, a populated place in Siskiyou County, California
 Black Bear Road, Forest Service Road 648, a jeep trail in Colorado

Sports
 Berkshire Black Bears, a minor league baseball team
 Maine Black Bears, the athletic teams representing the University of Maine
 West Virginia Black Bears, a minor league baseball team

Other uses
Blackbear (aka Submission), is an American drama film with Adam Minarovich
Black Bear (film), an American thriller drama film

See also
 

Animal common name disambiguation pages